Richard Eric King (born 3 January 1984) is a former English cricketer.  King was a right-handed batsman who bowled left-arm medium-fast.  He was born at Hitchin, Hertfordshire and educated at Bedford Modern School.

King made his debut in List-A cricket for the Northamptonshire Cricket Board against the Leicestershire Cricket Board in the 1st round of the 2002 Cheltenham & Gloucester Trophy which was played in 2001.  His second and final List-A match for the Board came in the 1st round of the 2003 Cheltenham & Gloucester Trophy against the Yorkshire Cricket Board which was played in 2002.

King made his first-class debut for Loughborough UCCE against Somerset in 2003.  From 2003 to 2008, he represented Loughborough UCCE in 11 first-class matches, the last of which came against Worcestershire.  In 2005, King played a single first-class match for Northamptonshire against the touring Bangladeshis.  During the same season he also represented the county in a single List-A match against Gloucestershire in the totesport League.

In 2007, King also represented the Marylebone Cricket Club in a single first-class match against Sri Lanka A.  In his combined first-class career, he played 13 matches during which he scored 207 runs at a batting average of 12.17, with a high score of 31.  With the ball he took 17 wickets at a bowling average of 55.35, with best figures of 4/34.  In the 3 List-A matches he played, he scored 2 runs and took 2 wickets at an average of 46.00, with best figures of 2/39.

References

External links
Richard King at Cricinfo
Richard King at CricketArchive

1984 births
People educated at Bedford Modern School
Living people
Sportspeople from Hitchin
English cricketers
Northamptonshire Cricket Board cricketers
Loughborough MCCU cricketers
Northamptonshire cricketers
Marylebone Cricket Club cricketers